Kalateh-ye Soltanabad may refer to:
 Salmanabad, Razavi Khorasan
 Soltanabad, Mashhad